De Paepe is a Dutch surname. Paep is another word for 'Pope'.

People 
 Aldo de Pape
 César De Paepe: prominent syndicalist. 
 Javier de Paepe: Argentine badminton player.
 Léon-Jean de Paepe: President of the Privy Council.
 Lorne De Pape: Olympic curler of New Zealand. 
 Thomas de Paep: Flemish painter

See also 
 26849 De Paepe, as asteroid
 Pape (surname)